Ribbon Music is an American-based independent Music Publishing Company, representing a diverse roster of international writers working across a multitude of genres including rock, country, punk, metal, dabke, electronic, Latin and folk.

For a complete list of clients and further information visit ribbonmusic.com.

References

American record labels
2011 establishments in California
Companies based in Los Angeles
Record labels established in 2011